Anthony Pereira (born 9 April 1982 in Navelim, Goa) is a former Indian professional footballer, who represented the India national football team on 29 occasions between 2009 and 2012.

Club career
Anthony started his football career in Vasco S.C. After 2 seasons, he moved to Dempo S.C. where his football career flourished under the coaching of Armando Colaco. During his 7-year stint at the club, Dempo S.C. won the I-League 4 times.

International career
On 22 August 2012, Pereira scored a goal in 84th minute against Syria coming as a second-half substitute in the Nehru Cup where India won 2–1.

Statistics

International 
Statistics accurate as of 15 November 2013

International goals

Honours

India
 SAFF Championship: 2011
 Nehru Cup: 2009, 2012

References

External links
 Profile at Goal.com
 
 

1982 births
Footballers from Goa
Living people
People from South Goa district
Indian footballers
I-League players
India international footballers
Vasco SC players
Dempo SC players
Churchill Brothers FC Goa players
Association football midfielders